Khalida Riyasat (July 7, 1953 – August 26, 1996) was a veteran Pakistani television actress. Along with Roohi Bano and Uzma Gillani, she dominated Pakistan's television screens during the 1970s, early 1980s and 1990s.

Family
She was the younger sister of notable television personality, Ayesha Khan.

Career
Riyasat's earliest drama was the detective series, Naamdaar. Her career took off with Haseena Moin's classic Bandish during the late 1970s. In another popular venture, she acted alongside actor Moin Akhtar in the cheek-in-tongue long play, Half-Plate by Anwar Maqsood. Some of her notable plays are Panah, Bandish, Dhoop, Deewar, Khoya Hua Aadmi, Silver Jubilee, Tabeer, Ab Tum Ja Saktey Ho and Parosi.

Personal life
Khalida married Faisal Saleh Hayat in 1984 and had two sons named Ali Faisal Saleh Hayat and Raza Faisal Saleh Hayat.

Death
Riyasat died of breast cancer on 26 August 1996 at age 43.

Filmography

Television serials
 Aik Muhabbat Sou Afsane
 Bandish
 Dhund 
 Naamdaar
 Lazawal
 Nasheman
 Maqsoom
 Saaye
 Adhay Chehray
 Ankahi
 Silver Jublie
 Tabeer
 Parosi
 Ab Tum Ja Saktey Ho

Telefilms
 Panah
 Dasht-e-Tanhai
 Ab Tum Ja Saktey Ho
 Khoya Huwa Aadmi
 Half Plate – 1980s as Begum Sahiba (wife of Mirza)
 Wadi-e-Purkhar
 Meri Sadgi Dekh
 Dhoop Deewar
 Nange Paon
 Baazdeed
 Naqsh e Saani
 Qarz
 Adhay Chehray
 Typist
 Umeed-e-Bahar

Honour
The Government of Pakistan named a street and intersection after her in Lahore on August 16th, 2021.

Awards and nominations

References

External links
 

1953 births
1996 deaths
Muhajir people
Pakistani television actresses
Pakistani film actresses
20th-century Pakistani actresses
Deaths from cancer in Pakistan
PTV Award winners